The art collections of Fondazione Cariplo are a gallery of artworks with a significant historical and artistic value owned by Fondazione Cariplo in Italy. It consists of 767 paintings, 116 sculptures, 51 objects and furnishings dating from the first century AD to the second half of the twentieth.

The collection includes examples of Late Antiquity stone sculpture, of Mediaeval wooden sculpture, and of Italian Renaissance and Baroque painting; its strength is in its collection of nineteenth-century Italian paintings, particularly from Lombardy.

Selected collection highlights

History of the collections
The Cariplo bank (Savings Bank of the Lombardy Provinces) began to form the collection in 1923, originally through the acquisition of paintings and sculptures by contemporary artists exhibited in Milan with the aim to promote and encourage the arts in Lombardy.
This policy continued after the Second World War, and increased with annual purchases of the Permanente company and exhibitions of religious art at the Angelicum. Since the late 1960s, it began to make purchases at sales held by auction houses.
The works of Istituto Bancario Italiano were added to its collection. It includes a portrait gallery of former Cariplo presidents.
After the passage of the Amato Law donations increased, including the (Manara Grolle, Marcenaro legacy).
Completing the collection of presidential portraits at the Cariplo, are paintings and sculptures of the nineteenth and twentieth century depicting many of the protagonists of the modern Italian economy.
The collection was inherited the aftermath of the Amato Law, the Cariplo Foundation increased as a result of subsequent donations (legacy Manara, Grolla, Marcenaro). In 2011 within the project, Share Your Knowledge, the foundation was made available under CC BY-SA boards of authors and works of art, including low-resolution images of the works in their collections.

Gallerie di Piazza Scala 

The Gallerie di Piazza Scala, a museum of nineteenth-century art, opened in Milan in 2011. It holds almost two hundred artworks from the Cariplo collections and those of Intesa San Paolo, ranging from bas-reliefs by Antonio Canova to works by Umberto Boccioni.

List of artists in the collections

A
 Vincenzo Abbati
 Mario Acerbi
 Francesco Albotto
 Attilio Alfieri
 Luca Alinari
 Aldo Andreani
 Antonianos di Afrodisia
 Fausto Antonioli
 Emanuele Appendini
 Andrea Appiani
 Ercole Salvatore Aprigliano
 Francesco Filippo Arata
 Silvestro Ariscola
B
 Giovanni Balansino
 Salvatore Balsamo
 Achille Barbaro
 Alessandro Barbieri
 Contardo Barbieri
 Donato Barcaglia
 Ugo Vittore Bartolini
 Ferruccio Baruffi
 Jacopo Bassano (bottega di)
 Francesco Battaglioli
 Ernesto Bazzaro
 Leonardo Bazzaro
 Mario Bazzi
 Alberto Bazzoni
 Giorgio Belloni
 Simon Benetton
 Nicolas Berchem
 Cirillo Bertazzoli
 Giorgina Bertolucci Di Vecchio
 Oreste Betti
 Mario Bettinelli
 Bartolomeo Bezzi
 Amedeo Bianchi
 Mosè Bianchi
 Giuseppe Biasi
 Mario Biazzi
 Mario Biglioli
 Osvaldo Bignami
 Adriana Bisi Fabbri
 Fulvia Bisi
 Luigi Bisi
 Giovanni Boldini
 Arturo Bonfanti
 Leonardo Borgese
 Pompeo Borra
 Odoardo Borrani
 Timo Bortolotti
 Carlo Bozzi
 Giovanni Brancaccio
 Gastone Breddo
 Cesare Breveglieri
 Luigi Brignoli
 Remo Brindisi
 Anselmo Bucci
 Vittorio Bussolino
C
 Guido Cadorin
 Alberto Caligiani
 Ercole Calvi
 Pompeo Calvi
 Gianfranco Campestrini
 Carlo Canella
 Giuseppe Canella
 Pietro Canonica
 Antonio Canova
 Innocente Cantinotti
 Giovanni Bernardo Carbone
 Filippo Carcano
 Francesco Carini
 Luca Carlevarijs
 Giovanni Carnovali
 Aldo Carpi
 Guido Carrer
 Rosalba Carriera
 Michele Cascella
 Daphne Casorati Maugham
 Giannino Castiglioni
 Vincenzo Catena (bottega di)
 Achille Cattaneo
 Luigi Cauda
 Ludovico Cavaleri
 Attilio Cavallini
 Carlo Ceresa
 Giuseppe Cerrina
 Gaetano Chierici
 Beppe Ciardi
 Emma Ciardi
 Guglielmo Ciardi
 Antonio Cifrondi
 Virginio Ciminaghi
 Pier Francesco Cittadini
 Viviano Codazzi
 Florin Codre
 Enrico Coleman
 Augusto Colombo
 Giovanni Colombo (painter)
 Adone Comboni
 Gigi Comolli
 Luigi Conconi
 Silvio Consadori
 Raffaello Consortini
 Aldo Conti
 Alfonso Corradi
 Salvatore Corvaya
 Gino Cosentino
 Ettore Cosomati
 Giovanni Costa
 Jacques Courtois
 Giuseppe Maria Crespi
 Carlo Cressini
 Luigi Crippa
D
 Edoardo Dalbono
 Angelo Dall'Oca Bianca
 Giovanni Stefano Danedi
 Arturo Dazzi
 Sebastiano De Albertis
 Cristoforo De Amicis
 Domenico De Bernardi
 Nicolas De Corsi
 Fernando De Filippi
 Raffaele De Grada
 Andrea De Lione
 Pedro De Mena
 Filippo De Pisis
 Francesco De Rocchi
 Jules Jean-Baptiste Dehaussy
 Mario Della Foglia
 Lorenzo Delleani
 Michele Desubleo
 Beppe Devalle
 Filippo Teodoro di Liagno
 Alfredo Di Romagna
 Adriano Di Spilimbergo
 Antonio Discovolo
 Gaspare Diziani
 Carlo Donelli
 Antonio Donghi
 Leonardo Dudreville
 Gaspard Dughet
E
 Giuseppe Elena
 Giovanni Antonio Emanueli
F
 Fabio Fabbi
 Guido Farina
 Gennaro Favai
 Giacomo Favretto
 Charles Fayod
 Gino Federici
 Adolfo Feragutti Visconti
 Gregorio Fernandez
 Arturo Ferrari
 Carlo Ferrari
 Giuseppe Ferrata
 Tano Festa
 Francesco Filippini
 Luigi Filocamo
 Napoleone Giovanni Fiumi
 Alessandro Focosi
 Pietro Foglia
 Enrico Fonda
 Achille Formis
 Piero Fornasetti
 Andrea Fossombrone
 Innocenzo Fraccaroli
 Pietro Fragiacomo
 Felicita Frai
 Umberto Franzosi
 Vittore Frattini
 Ernst Freiesleben
 Émile Friant
 Donato Frisia
 Achille Funi
G
 Giacomo Gandi
 Vincenzo Gemito
 Franco Gentilini
 Melchiorre Gherardini
 Eugenio Gignous
 Lorenzo Gignous
 Luigi Gioli
 Luca Giordano
 Bartolomeo Giuliano
 Piero Giunni
 Francesco Gnecchi
 Emilio Gola
 Marco Gozzi
 Giovanni Grande
 Nicola Grassi
 Ottavio Grolla
 Giannino Grossi
 Giacomo Grosso
 Orazio Costante Grossoni
 Kriss Guenzati Dubini
 Giuseppe Guerreschi
 Sergio Guerreschi
 Virgilio Guidi
 Bartolomeo Guidobono
 Renato Guttuso
 Beppe Guzzi
H
 Francesco Hayez
I
 Domenico Induno
 Gerolamo Induno
 Angelo Inganni
 Vincenzo Irolli
J
 Pio Joris
 Italo Josz
K
 Ivan Karpoff
 Hermann Kern
L
 Dino Lanaro
 Andrea Lanzani
 Cesare Laurenti
 Giovanni Battista Lelli
 Umberto Lilloni
 Fausto Locatelli
 Raffaello Locatelli
 Francesco Lojacono
 Emilio Longoni
 Alessandro Lupo
M
 Maestro dei fiori guardeschi
 Cesare Maggi
 Giuseppe Maggiolini
 Emilio Magistretti
 Giovanni Maimeri
 Vincenzo Malò
 Gianfranco Manara
 Antonio Mancini
 Carlo Mancini
 Francesco Mancini (1830–1905)
 Enrico Manfrini
 Luigi Mantovani
 Giuseppe Manzone
 Giacomo Manzù
 Anacleto Margotti
 Pompeo Mariani
 Piero Martina
 Arturo Martini
 Carlo Martini
 Guido Marussig
 Ennio Marzano
 Arrigo Renato Marzola
 Giuseppe Mascarini
 Aldo Mazza
 Giuseppe Menato
 Ilario Mercanti
 Francesco Messina
 Francesco Paolo Michetti
 Giovanni Migliara
 Vincenzo Migliaro
 Alessandro Milesi
 Arrigo Minerbi
 Federico Moja
 Giuseppe Molteni
 Giuseppe Montanari
 Cesare Monti
 Umberto Montini
 Angelo Morbelli
 Foggia Mario Moretti
 Antonio Moretti
 Gino Moro
 Marzio Moro
 Cesarina Mottironi
 Gabriele Mucchi
 Pieter Mulier
 Giulio Vito Musitelli
N
 Carlo Nangeroni
 Giovanna Nascimbene Tallone
 Renato Natali
 Gerolamo Navarra
 Mario Nigro
 Charles Francois Nivard
 Plinio Nomellini
 Luigi Nono
 Pietro Novelli
 Giuseppe Novello
O
 Augusto Ortolani
 Pasquale Ottino
P
 Carlo Paganini
 Eleuterio Pagliano
 Giuseppe Palanti
 Filippo Palizzi
 Giuseppe Palizzi
 Laura Panno
 Gilda Pansiotti Cambon D'Amico
 Pierluigi Parzini
 Arturo Pasetto
 Antonio Pasinetti
 Lazzaro Pasini
 Ezio Pastorio
 Angelo Pavan
 Riccardo Pellegrini
 Ugo Piatti
 Antonio Piccinni
 Orazio Pigato
 Ernesto Pirovano
 Carlo Pizzi
 Lodovico Pogliaghi
 Silvio Poma
 Giuseppe Ponga
 Giacomo Antonio Ponsonelli
 Giuseppe Porta (painter 1807)
 Walter Pozzi
 Luigi Prada
 Attilio Pratella
 Carlo Preda
 Luigi Premazzi
 Gaetano Previati
 Giulio Cesare Procaccini
 Scipione Pulzone
Q
 Gianni Quaglio
 Luigi Querena
R
 Ambrogio Raffele
 Aldo Raimondi
 Camillo Rapetti
 Richard Reinagle Ramsay
 Gian Piero Restellini
 Leonardo Roda
 Alonzo Rodriguez
 Pietro Ronzoni
 Johann Heinrich Roos
 Ottone Rosai
 Mario Rossello
 Attilio Rossi
 Giulio Rossi
 Luigi Rossi
 Vanni Rossi
 Carlo Fortunato Rosti
 Francesco Rustici
 Teodolinda Sabaino Migliara
S
 Paolo Sala
 Roberto Sambonet
 Salvatore Saponaro
 Francesco Sartorelli
 Giulio Aristide Sartorio
 Aligi Sassu
 Ferruccio Scattola
 Gregorio Sciltian
 Alfredo Scocchera
 Lello Scorzelli
 Giovanni Segantini
 Pompilio Seveso
 Pacifico Sidoli
 Telemaco Signorini
 Giuseppe Simonelli
 Francesco Simonini
 Mario Sironi
 Ardengo Soffici
 Giuseppe Solenghi
 Emilio Sommariva
 Giovanni Sottocornola
 Armando Spadini
 Francesco Speranza
 Ilario Spolverini
 Nino Springolo
 Romano Stefanelli
 Ottavio Steffenini
 Luigi Stracciari
T
 Remo Taccani
 Clemente Tafuri
 Carlo Costantino Tagliabue
 Cesare Tallone
 Guido Tallone
 Orfeo Tamburi
 Giovanni Battista Tiepolo
 Sirio Tofanari
 Fiorenzo Tomea
 Adolfo Tommasi
 Ludovico Tommasi
 Arturo Tosi
 Ernesto Treccani
 Angelo Trezzini
 Giulio Turcato
U
 Giuseppe Ugolini
 Stefano Ussi
V
 Bassano Vaccarini
 Francesco Valaperta
 Ludwig Valenta
 Simon Johannes van Douw
 Allaer Van Everdingen
 Gaspar Van Wittel
 Francesco Vanni
 Alessandro Varotari
 Vincenzo Vela
 Mario Vellani Marchi
 Gaspare Venturini
 Renato Vernizzi
 Giulio Cesare Vinzio
 Volterrano Volterrani
W
 Richard Wilson
 Teodoro Wolf Ferrari
X
 Ettore Ximenes
Z
 Luigi Zago
 Giuseppe Zais
 Lodovico Zambeletti
 Adelina Zandrino
 Vittore Zanetti Zilla
 Bartholomaeus Zeitblom
 Umberto Ziveri
 Carlo Zocchi
 Guido Zuccaro
 Luigi Zuccoli

See also
 Fondazione Cariplo
 Gallerie di Piazza Scala
Google Arts & Culture

References

 Fondazione Cassa di Risparmio delle Province Lombarde, Le collezioni d'arte - Dal Classico al Neoclassico, ed. Maria Luisa Gatti Perer, 1998
 Fondazione Cassa di Risparmio delle Province Lombarde, Le collezioni d'arte - L'Ottocento, ed. Sergio Rebora, 1999
 Fondazione Cassa di Risparmio delle Province Lombarde, Le collezioni d'arte - Il Novecento, ed. Sergio Rebora, 2000

External links
 Official opening of Gallerie d'Italia - Piazza Scala (on Wikinews - Italian)
 Artgate Fondazione Cariplo
Art collection of Fondazione Cariplo within Google Arts & Culture

Art museums and galleries in Milan
Gallerie di Piazza Scala
Fondazione Cariplo
Tourist attractions in Milan